Euriphene amieti is a butterfly in the family Nymphalidae. It is found in south-eastern Cameroon.

References

Butterflies described in 1997
Euriphene
Endemic fauna of Cameroon
Butterflies of Africa